The Gotter Hotel, at 301 W. Main St. in Enterprise, Oregon, is an Early Commercial-style building that was built in 1917.  It is a timber post and beam building with a stretcher bond brick exterior.

It was listed on the National Register of Historic Places in 1994.  It was deemed significant "as a substantial, notably intact and singular example, locally, of Commercial-style architecture expressed in polychromed brick" and as an "outstanding example" from Enterprise's commercial building boom era.

References

External links

Hotel buildings on the National Register of Historic Places in Oregon
Buildings designated early commercial in the National Register of Historic Places
Hotel buildings completed in 1917
Buildings and structures in Enterprise, Oregon
National Register of Historic Places in Wallowa County, Oregon